Niccolò d'Este may refer to:

 Niccolò I d'Este, Marquis of Ferrara (died 1344), see Duke of Ferrara and of Modena
 Niccolò II d'Este, Marquis of Ferrara (1338–1388)
 Niccolò III d'Este, Marquis of Ferrara (1383–1441)

See also

 House of Este
 Niccolò (name)
 Este (disambiguation)